Benjamin Maxwell Acton II (2 December 1927 – 10 July 2020) was an Australian ice hockey player. He competed in the 1960 Winter Olympics.

References

External links
 
 
 

1927 births
2020 deaths
Australian ice hockey players
Olympic ice hockey players of Australia
Ice hockey players at the 1960 Winter Olympics
People from Footscray, Victoria
Sportspeople from Melbourne
Australian male field hockey players
Field hockey players from Melbourne
Sportsmen from Victoria (Australia)
Ice hockey officials